The fifth season of Matlock originally aired in the United States on NBC from September 18, 1990 through April 30, 1991.

Cast 
 Andy Griffith as Ben Matlock
 Nancy Stafford as Michelle Thomas
 Julie Sommars as ADA Julie March
 Clarence Gilyard Jr. as Conrad McMasters

Cast Notes
Julie Sommars was absent for 14 episodes
Nancy Stafford was absent for 8 episodes
Clarence Gilyard Jr. was absent for 4 episodes

Episodes

References

External links 
 

1990 American television seasons
1991 American television seasons
05